The 1967 Tirreno–Adriatico was the second edition of the Tirreno–Adriatico cycle race and was held from 8 March to 12 March 1967. The race started in Santa Marinella and finished in San Benedetto del Tronto. The race was won by Franco Bitossi.

General classification

References

1967
1967 in Italian sport